The 2018 Vintage Yachting Games was the third post-Olympic multi-class sailing event for discontinued Olympic and Paralympic Classes. The event was held from 16–22 September 2018 on Øresund, Copenhagen in Denmark. The organization of this event was executed by a joint venture of the Kongelig Dansk Yachtklub and the Hellerup Sejlklub. The Vintage Yachting Games Organization (VYGO) was the governing organization.
The competition took place in 3 Vintage Yachting Classes.

Prologue

First bidding process 
The first bidding process was officially launched on 14 December 2010. The bidding process intended to run till 31 December 2011. This period was extended on request of several candidates.

Before the bidding process started there was an interest for hosting the event from:
  Lake Chiemsee
  Black sea
  Weymouth and Portland National Sailing Academy
  Stockholm

During the bidding process this group extended with:
  Boltenhagen
  Douarnenez

The Vintage Yachting Games supervisory board finally voted unanimous to accept the bid of the Weymouth and Portland National Sailing Academy and not for reopening or extending the bidding process. The venue of the 2016 Vintage Yachting Games was formally announced during the closing ceremony of the 2012 edition.

Second bidding process 
As soon as the Weymouth and Portland National Sailing Academy withdraw from the event a second bidding process was started for a postponed event in 2018. Bids arrived from four countries:
  Circolo Nautico Punta Imperatore, Forio d’Ischia
  Kongelig Dansk Yachtklub and Hellerup Sejlklub
  Lübecker Yacht – Club, (as part of the Travemünder Woche)
  Union Yacht Club Attersee and the Segel Club Kammersee
The classes than had the possibility to vote. As result the Danish bid was chosen unanimously for the third edition (2018) and the Austria for the fourth edition (year t.b.d. 2020–2022). The dates of the 2018 Vintage were announced in 2016 to the Vintage classes.

Voting result 
The bonus point system was used over the eight voting classes (no discard)
1  10 points
2  47.7 points
3  53.4 points
4  64.4 points

2018 Vintage

Organization

Venue 
As Venue for the 2018 Vintage Yachting Games the Øresund for Hellerup chosen. The hostclubs were the Kongelig Dansk Yachtklub and the Hellerup Sejlklub. The clubhouse and harbor of the Hellerup Sejlklub was used to facilitate the event.

Calendar 
The program of the 2018 Vintage Yachting Games was as follows:

Competition

Continents 
 Africa
 Europe
 North America
 Asia

Countries

Current Vintage Yachting Classes 

 • = Event in this year
 VIP = Used for the Vintage Inter Pares race
  = Open event
  = Female event
  = Male event

Due to circumstances that varied by class only three out of 12 of the Vintage Yachting Classes participated in the 2018 Vintage Yachting Games at Hellerup.

Course Area's and Courses

Wind conditions 
The Øresund in front of the Hellerup Sejlklub was during the 2018 Vintage Yachting Games one of the targets of the remains of the Hurricane Florence. This resulted in South-Westerly winds that varied between 12-38 knots over the period of the Vintage.

Measurement 
Since all three classes just had major championships that include measurement, no measurement took place in this Vintage.

Opening ceremony 
The opening ceremony took place in the main hall of the club house of the Hellerup Sejlklub. The formal opening was done by Rasmus Knude of Hellerup Sejlklub.

Closing ceremony 
Due to the weather conditions the VIP race could not be started. So the closing ceremony started with the prize giving by Lars Ive and Peter Lübeck Stephenson.

During the closing of the event Rudy den Outer handed over stainless remembrance plate with the Vintage logo to Peter Lübeck Stephenson. He also announced that the Union-Yacht-Club Attersee will be the host of the next Vintage Yachting Games. However before the date will be set an evaluation with the classes and organizers will take place. After that the Vintage flag was received from Lars Ive, representing the Copenhagen organization. The flag was subsequently handed over to Stephan Beurle representing Austria as the next host country.

Media Coverage 
Pictures and video footage was received for Creative Commons Attribution-Share Alike 4.0 International distribution from:
Per Heegaard
Ann Fillipa Madsen
Lars Ive
and others

Sailing 
Races in all events were sailed in a fleet racing format of eight scheduled races. The contestants raced around a course in one group, and each boat earned a score equal conform the bonus point system.  Due to wind conditions not all scheduled races could be sailed.

Reports per event 
Per class separate pages reporting the facts are available (see the details section per class in the medals table).

Report Vintage InterPares race 
Due to the weather conditions the VIP race could not be sailed. Since all winners came from the Netherlands the decision was made to sail the VIP race on a later date in 2018/2019 somewhere in the Netherlands. This is in line with the history of the 12' Dinghy at the 1920 Summer Olympics were the last race was not sailed in Belgium but in The Netherlands.

Medal summary

Medals

Vintage 2018

Vintage 2008–2018

Country Trophy 
The best ranked competitor per class per country scores point for his country based on his overall ranking and the 1964 Olympic scoring system. The highest scored country wins the Country trophy.

References 

Information about the Vintage Yachting Classes (former Olympic classes) can be verified by the:
 International Olympic Committee
 World Sailing
 Nederlands Scheepvaartmuseum Amsterdam
 
Information about the organization, conditions, sailors and results can be verified by the:
 Manage 2 Sail
 Vintage Yachting Games Organization
 12' Dinghy International Rule:
 International Olympiajol Union
 International Soling Association

 
2018
Vintage Yachting Games, 2018